Theilin Phanbuh is an Indian social worker and the chairperson of the Meghalaya State Commission for Women (MSCW). Born on 13 April 1946 in Shillong in the Northeast Indian state of Meghalaya, she is reported to have been actively involved with the socio-cultural milieu of the state, especially in cases where women's rights are challenged and delivers lectures on the topic. The Government of India awarded her the fourth highest civilian honour of the Padma Shri, in 2005, for her contributions to Indian society.

References 

Recipients of the Padma Shri in social work
1946 births
People from Shillong
Journalists from Meghalaya
Social workers
Indian women's rights activists
Living people
Meghalaya politicians
20th-century Indian educational theorists
20th-century Indian women politicians
20th-century Indian politicians
Women in Meghalaya politics
Scholars from Meghalaya
Social workers from Meghalaya
Women educators from Meghalaya
Educators from Meghalaya
20th-century women educators